Charlotte Fell Smith (2 January 1851 – 7 May 1937) was an English historian born at Pattiswick Hall, Essex, to Joseph Smith (1813–1904), farmer, and his wife, Mary.

Writings
Charlotte Fell Smith was the author of the first biography of John Dee in 1909. She was also a contributor to the Dictionary of National Biography.

References

External links

British historians
1851 births
1937 deaths
British biographers
People from Essex
People from Braintree District